Medtronic, Inc. v. Mirowski Family Ventures, LLC, 571 U.S. 191 (2014), is a case of the Supreme Court of the United States that deals with civil procedure, and specifically with the question of the burden of proof required in pursuing declaratory judgments.

Background
In 1991, Medtronic and Mirowski entered into an agreement permitting Medtronic to practice certain Mirowski patents in exchange for royalty payments. In 2007, the parties found themselves in the midst of an "infringement" dispute, and Mirowski gave Medtronic notice that it believed seven new Medtronic products violated various claims contained in two of its patents, which dealt with cardiac resynchronization therapy, a pacemaker that is used to treat congestive heart failure. Medtronic thought that its products did not infringe Mirowski's patents, either because the products fell outside the scope of the patent claims or because the patents were invalid.

Medtronic brought an action for declaratory judgment in the United States District Court for the District of Delaware, seeking a declaration that its products did not infringe Mirowski's patents and that the patents were invalid.

The courts below
The District Court recognized that Mirowski was the defendant in the action, but it held that Mirowski, "[a]s the part[y] asserting infringement," bore the burden of proving infringement. After a bench trial, the court found that Mirowski had not proved infringement, either directly or under the doctrine of equivalents, and it therefore lost.

On appeal, the United States Court of Appeals for the Federal Circuit held that "when an infringement counterclaim by a patentee is foreclosed by the continued existence of a license, a licensee seeking a declaratory judgment of noninfringement and of no consequent liability under the license bears the burden of persuasion." Therefore, Medtronic, as plaintiff, bore the burden of proof, and the District Court ruling was vacated and remanded.

Because of the importance of burdens of proof in patent litigation, the Supreme Court granted certiorari to hear the appeal.

At the Supreme Court
In a unanimous ruling, the Court reversed the Federal Circuit ruling. Justice Breyer held that, when a licensee seeks a declaratory judgment against a patentee to establish that there is no infringement, the burden of proving infringement remains with the patentee. He stated that "Simple legal logic, resting upon settled case law, strongly supports our conclusion." The case law in question has held that:

Following the traditional rule that the plaintiff has the burden of proof, the "burden of proving infringement generally rests upon the patent[-holder]" seeking to enforce the patent.
"The operation of the Declaratory Judgment Act [is] only procedural," leaving "substantive rights unchanged."
"The burden of proof is a substantive aspect of a claim."

Breyer also noted that "practical considerations lead to the same conclusion":

Since the Declaratory Judgment Act does not "extend" the "jurisdiction" of the federal courts, the action is properly characterized as one "arising under an Act of Congress relating to patents." It could therefore be raised in place of an infringement suit:

Impact
Medtronic is a consequence of the Court's previous ruling in MedImmune, Inc. v. Genentech, Inc., which cleared the way for declaratory judgments to be sought in patent cases. The question as to who bears the burden of proof in such proceedings was the matter at issue in the present case. One commentator welcomed it, saying, "the straightforward, undiverted analysis of the burden of proof question would be perfect for the section of a civil procedure text on declaratory judgments."

Other commentators pointed out that the case was a reminder that patentees should take great care when corresponding with its licensees, as the former must bear the burden of proving their assertions in any subsequent litigation.

Notes

References

External links
 

United States biotechnology case law
United States civil procedure case law
United States patent case law
United States Supreme Court cases
United States Supreme Court cases of the Roberts Court
2014 in United States case law
Medtronic litigation